Taipei Nangang Exhibition Center, also known as TWTC Nangang Exhibition Hall or TaiNEX, is a superimposed purpose-built exhibition complex in Nangang District, Taipei, Taiwan. It consists of two exhibition halls and is located to the northeast of the Taipei World Trade Center (TWTC), about a 15-minute drive from the TWTC along the Huandong Expressway.

Hall 1 (TaiNEX 1)

Construction began in March 2005, costing US $110 million, and was completed in 2008.

Lower exhibition floor
Electricity and water supply lines are paved beneath the floor surface. The floor can be divided into three areas to accommodate three events taking place at the same time.

Upper exhibition floor
It is a sufficient venue for large-scale trade shows, conventions, sports or other events.

Two large entrance halls,  and  respectively, are located both on the ground and the fourth floors and can be used for registration, meeting areas, information distribution, and other pre-function activities.

Hall 2 (TaiNEX 2)

A second exhibition hall was completed in 2019. The nine-story building is situated on a 3.36-hectare lot adjacent to the first exhibition hall.

Access

The Exhibition Center is served by the Taipei Metro via the Taipei Nangang Exhibition Center Station.

Notable events
 3 April 2009: Dig Out Your Soul Tour – the concert by Oasis.
 8 May 2010: Rapture of the Deep tour – the concert by Deep Purple.
 29 July 2010: Pandemonium Tour – the concert by Pet Shop Boys.
 18 February 2011: Number Ones, Up Close and Personal – the sixth concert by Janet Jackson, in support of her second compilation album, Number Ones.
 13 May 2011: The Black Star Tour – the fourth concert by Avril Lavigne.
 3 July 2011: Aphrodite: Les Folies Tour – the eleventh concert tour by Kylie Minogue, in support of her studio album, Aphrodite.
 6 November 2011  x-japan World Tour
 17 March 2012: 20th L'Anniversary World Tour 2012 – the concert tour by L'Arc-en-Ciel, in celebrating their 20 years anniversary.
 17 and 18 May 2012: The Born This Way Ball Tour – the third concert tour by Lady Gaga, in support of her second studio album, Born This Way.
 10 August 2013: Biophilia Tour – the seventh concert tour by Björk, supporting the eponymous studio album Biophilia.
 26 October 2014: The Elusive Chanteuse Show – the eighth concert tour by Mariah Carey, supporting the studio album Me. I Am Mariah... The Elusive Chanteuse.
 21 August 2015: Smoke + Mirrors Tour – the second concert by Imagine Dragons.
 14 and 15 September 2015: Maroon V Tour – the concert by Maroon 5.
 28 September 2015: Bon Jovi’s concert was canceled due to Typhoon Dujuan, as the Taipei City government announced school and office closures for that day.
 7 May 2016: Summer Nights – the concert by Olivia Newton-John.
 19 September 2016: Queen + Adam Lambert 2016 Summer Festival Tour – the concert by Queen + Adam Lambert.
 3 October 2016: Return to Forever / 50th Anniversary Tour – the successive tour of Get Your Sting and Blackout World Tour by Scorpions
 29 November 2016: Live in Taipei – the concert by Sigur Rós.
 13 June 2017: Britney Spears: Piece of Me Tour – the ninth concert tour by Britney Spears.
 7 and 8 October 2017: Act III: M.O.T.T.E World Tour – the second world tour by G-Dragon.
 17 April 2018: 24K Magic World Tour – the third concert tour by Bruno Mars.
 24 and 25 December 2018: 2018 IU 10th Anniversary Tour Concert (dlwlrma) – the eighth concert tour by IU.

See also
Taiwan Trade Shows
Taipei World Trade Center
Taiwan External Trade Development Council

References

External links 

Taipei Nangang Exhibition Center
TAIWANTRADE

2008 establishments in Taiwan
Commercial buildings completed in 2008
Convention centers in Taipei